Konstantin Afanasyevich Novikov (6 August 1919 — 9 January 1958) was a Soviet flying ace during World War II and who was awarded the title Hero of the Soviet Union on 1 May 1943 for his initial victories. Historians disagree on the exact breakdown of his final tally at the end of the war, with Mikhail Bykov indicating he totaled 28 solo and five (or three) shared shootdowns, while Andrey Simonov puts his tally at 31 solo and nine shared.

References 

1919 births
1958 deaths
Soviet World War II flying aces
Heroes of the Soviet Union
Recipients of the Order of Lenin
Recipients of the Order of the Red Banner
Recipients of the Order of Alexander Nevsky
Pilots who performed an aerial ramming